Dewitt Jones is an American professional photographer, writer, film director and public speaker, who is known for his work as a freelance photojournalist for National Geographic and his column in Outdoor Photographer Magazine. He produced and directed two films nominated for Academy Awards: Climb (1974), nominated for Best Live Action Short Film, and John Muir's High Sierra (1974), nominated for Best Short Subject Documentary.  He has published several books.

Work

His column, Basic Jones, has appeared in Outdoor Photographer magazine for over 18 years. In it, Dewitt explores the spiritual side of photography.

Dewitt has also produced a number of training films including Celebrate What's Right with the World and Everyday Creativity.

Education

He is a cum laude graduate of Dartmouth College with a B.A. in Drama and holds a master's degree in filmmaking from UCLA.

Awards and legacy

Dewitt is the recipient of the Sierra Club's Ansel Adams Award for Conservation Photography which honors "superlative photography that has been used to further conservation causes".

His 1974 film Climb was preserved by the Academy Film Archive in 2013.

Books and articles
He has written nine books: California!, Visions of Wilderness, What the Road Passes By, Robert Frost - A Tribute to the Source, Canyon Country, John Muir's High Sierra, and The Nature of Leadership which was created with Stephen R. Covey.

Bibliography

References

External links
Dewitt Jones Productions, Inc

1943 births
Living people
American documentary filmmakers
American photojournalists
National Geographic Society
Sierra Club awardees